The Bled agreement (also referred to as the "Tito–Dimitrov treaty") was an agreement signed on the 1 August 1947 in Bled, PR Slovenia, FPR Yugoslavia. It was signed by Georgi Dimitrov, Bulgarian leader, and Josip Broz Tito, Yugoslav leader, which paved the way for future unification between the states in a new Balkan Federative Republic. It also foresaw the unification of Vardar Macedonia and Pirin Macedonia and the return of Western Outlands to Bulgaria. The agreement abolished visas and allowed for a customs union. It was also the first time that Bulgaria recognized ethnic Macedonians and the Macedonian language.

These agreements mark the mutual aspirations and efforts to develop new relations between the two countries. They agreed that the government will take over NR Bulgaria to ensure the rights of ethnic Macedonians in Pirin Macedonia (now Blagoevgrad Province) in free national economic and cultural development.

The Bled agreement was accepted with the Treaty on Friendship, cooperation and mutual assistance between Yugoslavia and the People's Republic of Bulgaria, signed and published in Evksinograd. The treaty contains: several of the Agreement on economic cooperation, on customs facilitation, agreement for preparation of a customs union, the facilitation of border crossings, border crossing on the border of population and of the citizenship between the two countries. The Yugoslav Government waived $25 million in war damages owed by Bulgaria.
 
The policies resulting from the agreement were reversed after the Tito–Stalin split in June 1948, when Bulgaria, not wanting to be a seventh republic of Yugoslavia as Tito imagined and being tied to the interests of the Soviet Union, took a stance against Yugoslavia.
When the Cominform campaign against Yugoslavia severed the Yugoslav Communist party leadership, the government of the People's Republic of Bulgaria on 1 October 1949 deleted the Treaty of Friendship, Cooperation and Mutual Assistance of Bled with all agreements. A recently declassified CIA document from November 1948 outlines the tensions between the two countries and the outlook of the people of Yugoslav Macedonia.

Notes

References 
 Stavrianos, L. (1964) Balkan Federation: A History of the Movement Toward Balkan Unity in Modern Times. (Hamden, CT: Archon Books).

1947 in Yugoslavia
Contemporary history of Slovenia
1947 in Bulgaria
Treaties concluded in 1947
Treaties of the People's Republic of Bulgaria
Treaties of Yugoslavia
Agreement
Yugoslav Macedonia
Modern history of the Blagoevgrad Province
Bulgaria–Yugoslavia relations
August 1947 events in Europe